Le Concert is a 2016 live album by Alain Souchon and Laurent Voulzy on Columbia. The singers' first live collaboration, it was recorded at Zénith de Paris, in December 2015, except for the track "Il roule, les fleurs du bal", recorded at the Espace Glenmore, Carhaix, at the Festival des Vieilles Charrues, 16 July 2016. The album reached #15 in the French album charts.

Track listing
Disc 1
Dans Le Vent Qui Va	2:46
J'Ai Dix Ans	3:30
Bubble Star	4:48
Jamais Content	3:22
Bad Boys	4:34
Caché Derrière	5:42
Et Si En Plus Y'A Personne	4:17
Oiseau Malin	5:53
La Baie Des Fourmis	3:25
C'Est Déjà Ça	4:43
Poulaillers' Song	3:32
La Fille D'Avril	3:27
Le Rêve Du Pecheur	5:24
Somerset Maugham	11:40
Bidon	4:32
Allô Maman Bobo	3:25
La Ballade De Jim	5:41
On Était Beau	0:51

Disc 2
Souffrir De Se Souvenir	5:10
Cœur Grenadine	6:40
Le Bagad De Lann-Bihoué	5:37
Jeanne	6:06
Amélie Colbert
Le Soleil Donne	5:30
Derrière Les Mots	4:13
Le Pouvoir Des Fleurs	5:09
Foule Sentimentale
Rockollection	9:09
Belle-Île-En-Mer, Marie-Galante	4:53
Il Roule (Les Fleurs Du Bal)	5:36

Blu-ray 1
The concert

Blu-ray 2
Clip "Il Roule (Les Fleurs Du Bal)"

References

2016 live albums
Alain Souchon albums
Collaborative albums